Riddle of the Sphinx is a vertically-scrolling action-adventure game written by Bob Smith for the Atari 2600 and published by Imagic in 1982. The player, as the Prince of Egypt, must collect treasures and gain strength to release the land from a vile curse.

Smith wrote several other games for Imagic, including Star Voyager and Dragonfire.

Gameplay
The goal of Riddle of the Sphinx is to reach the Temple of Ra and make the correct offering.

Reception
Richard A. Edwards reviewed Riddle of the Sphinx in The Space Gamer No. 58. Edwards commented that "It is a masterful blend of strategy and arcade gaming in a home cartridge. Take this one home."

See also

List of Atari 2600 games

References

External links
Riddle of the Sphinx at Atari Mania
1984 Software Encyclopedia from Electronic Games
Article in Computer and Video Games
Review in Vidiot
Article in Video Games

1982 video games
Atari 2600 games
Atari 2600-only games
Action-adventure games
Imagic games
Single-player video games
Video games about time travel
Video games based on Egyptian mythology
Video games developed in the United States
Video games set in Egypt